Statue of David Livingstone may refer to:
 Statue of David Livingstone, Edinburgh, Scotland
 Statue of David Livingstone, Zimbabwe

See also
 Cultural depictions of David Livingstone